The North Northumberland Football League is a football competition based in England.

When it had two divisions, the highest (Division One) sat at level 14 of the English football league system and was a feeder to the Northern Alliance. The league consisted of teams from between the rivers Tweed and Wansbeck.

Member teams compete in the Northumberland FA Minor Cup as well as six cup competitions run by the league; The Bilclough Cup, The Sanderson Cup, The Anderson Cup, The Runciman Cup and The Robson Cup.

Recent champions

2022–23 Clubs
Alnmouth
Alnwick Town B
Berwick Town
Ellington
Longhoughton
Lowick United	
Newbiggin
North Sunderland	
Swarland
Wooler

External links
League website
FA Full Time page
Alnmouth United website

 
Football in Northumberland
Defunct football leagues in England
Sports leagues established in 1898
1898 establishments in England
2019 disestablishments in England